Compsoceridius gounellei is a species of beetle in the family Cerambycidae, the only species in the genus Compsoceridius.

References

Compsocerini